The Factory Theater is a Chicago theatre company founded in 1992. Originally working out of a 50-seat storefront theater in the Rogers Park neighborhood in the northern part of Chicago, the company has produced over 100 shows during its existence (all original scripts written by ensemble members). The typical schedule during the first five seasons of the Factory Theater was a Thursday evening show, a Friday/Saturday mainstage show, and a Friday/Saturday late-night show. In 1997, after years of ongoing improvements and renovations to the theater in an unsuccessful attempt to satisfy building-code requirements, the company moved out of its Rogers Park storefront and into the Footsteps Theater's space on Clark Street in the Andersonville neighborhood. They were itinerant from 2000-2003 then took residence at the Prop Thtr in Chicago. As of 2015, they have moved into their new 70-seat space right back in Rogers Park on Howard Street right by the CTA Red Line.

Artistic leadership
In the resurgence of live theater at the tail end of the pandemic, the Factory announced new Co-Artistic Directors--long time ensemble members Timothy C Amos and Shannon O'Neill. 
In 2017, the Factory announced the election of their new artistic leadership team, Co-Artistic Directors Stacie Barra and Manny Tamayo. Barra and Tamayo replaced Scott OKen who had served as Artistic Director since 2007. Prior to 2007, the Artistic Director was founding member and radio personality Nick Digilio.

The Factory Theater West
The Factory Theater West, composed of Factory Theater ensemble members who had relocated to Los Angeles, produced five productions from 1999-2001. All productions were either remounts of past Factory Theater shows or original works.

Members

Founding
Sean Abley
Bo Blackburn
Michael Meredith
Tom Purcell
Jeff Rogers
Amy Seeley

Current ensemble

Past and emeritus ensemble

Production history

1992
Snafu: sketch comedy
Reefer Madness by Sean Abley

1993
Attack of the Killer B's by Sean Abley
Tribe: improv with Bo Blackburn, Joe Dempsey, Marssie Mencotti and Kent Sterling
The Angry Show by Nick Digilio and Mike Meredith
Buckets of Blood by Marssie Mencotti and Dave Springer (based on the film)
Bitches by Sean Abley
Santa Claus Conquers the Martians - The Musical: book by Sean Abley, lyrics by Sean Abley and Amy Seeley, music by Dave Springer

1994
Hooray! conceived by Amy Seeley, written by Sean Abley, Mike Beyer, Bo Blackburn, Heather Delker, Jenny Kirkland-Laffey, Joey Meyer, Mike Meredith, Amy Seeley and Wendy Tregay
Alive by Nick Digilio and Mike Meredith
Kong! by George Brant
Free Pizza: by Mike Beyer
Man Card by Kirk Pynchon and Jesse Dienstag
Disco Bob: improv with Sean Abley, Bo Blackburn, Mike Meredith, Amy Seeley and Eric Frankie
Beaverhunt by Amy Seeley and Jenny Kirkland-Laffey

1995
Sabotage by Kirk Pynchon and Jesse Dienstag
Jailbait by Amy Seeley
P by Sean Abley, Bo Blackburn, Heather Delker, Jenny Kirkland-Laffey, Amy Seeley
Pet-Scare Theater by Jill Rothamer
White Trash Wedding and a Funeral by Mike Beyer and Bill Havle
The Christmas Show by Joey Meyer

1996
Preying Manthis by Wendy Tregay
ABBArama conceived and written by Amy Seeley
My Period by Jenny Kirkland-Laffey
Urban Legends by Bo Blackburn
Being at Choice: by Mike Meredith
Win, Place or Show by Nick Digilio and Ernie Deak
529 S. Something by Molly Brennan
Rapid Fire by Molly Brennan
Utterly, Completely Bored Out of My Friggin' Mind by Jill Rothamer
Escape from The North Pole by Nick Digilio and Mike Meredith
Second City Didn't Want Us, or, Is There a Spot in the Touring Company for My Girlfriend? sketch comedy conceived by Sean Abley and written by Sean Abley, Bo Blackburn, Brooke Dillman, Eric Frankie, Jenny Kirkland-Laffey, Mike Meredith and Amy Seeley

1997
Nuclear Family by Sean Abley
Battleaxe Betty by Molly Brennan 
The Surreal World
Clean by Michael Meredith
Fat! by Michelle Suffredin
The Factory Theater's Shut Up and Laugh Comedy Festival

1998
The Barbara Walters Interviews by Jenny Kirkland-Laffey
The Factory All-Star Late Night Fiasco
Vinyl Shop by Nick Digilio and Mike Vieau
Amy Seeley and the Moline Madman by Amy Seeley
The Factory Theater's Shut Up and Laugh Comedy Festival

1999
Herb Stabler, Wandering Spirit by Mike Beyer
Surface Dwellers by Scott OKen and Ernest Deak
Dancing With the Past by Patricia Sutherland
Factory Match Game '99
Dragontales by Molly Brennan 
Endzone by  Michael Mazzara
The Factory Theater's Shut Up and Laugh Comedy Festival
White Trash Wedding and a Funeral (Factory Theater West)
Attack of the Killer B's (Factory Theater West): Winner, Backstage West Garland Award for Best Adaptation

2000
Gooooooo Speech Team! by Jenny Kirkland 
Being at Choice (Factory Theater West)
Kirk du Soleil (Factory Theater West)

2001
Variations on Death
Captain Raspberry by Matthew O'Neill
The Life and Death of Barb Budonovich
Poppin' and Lockdown by Kirk Pynchon and Michael Meredith (Factory Theater West)

2002
Poppin and Lockdown by Kirk Pynchon and Michael Meredith
Lab Rats by Various Artists
Eagle Hills, Eagle Ridge, Eagle Landing by Brett Neveu
Among the Dead by Ryan Oliver

2003
Dick Danger: DJ Crime Solver
Factory Theater Presents.....CHICAGOSTYLE by Various Artists
Here Comes a Regular by Nick Digilio and Mike Vieau

2004
Being at Choice (remount) by Mike Meredith
Poppin and Lockdown 2: Dance the Right Thing by Kirk Pynchon and Mike Meredith
Ménage À Trailer by Laura McKenzie and Mark Sam Rosenthal

2005
Toast of the Town by Scott OKen and Ernie Deak
Lonesome Hoboes by George Brandt
Top Shelf... by Scott OKen

2006
The Willing Participant by Matthew O'Neill
GIs in Europe by Scott OKen and Ernie Deak
Operation Infiltration: An Experiment in Terror by Manny Tamayo

2007
Janice Dutts Goes to Life Camp by Laura McKenzie
Siskel & Ebert Save Chicago by Eric Roach
Dirty Diamonds by Mike Beyer

2008
Ceres by Heather Tyler
Ren Faire! A Fistfull of Ducats by Matt Engle
Shameless Shamuses by Ernie Deak
Bustin' Out of the Hell by Scott OKen

2009
Mop Top Festival by Scott OKen
Dead Wrong by Manny Tamayo
1985 by Chas Vrba
Hunky Dory by Joe Gehr

2010
Hey! Dancin! by Kirk Pynchon and Mike Beyer
The League of Awesome by Corrbette Pasko and Sara Sevigny
Jenny and Jenni by Shannon O'Neill and Christine Jennings
1985 (remount at the DCA Storefront Theatre) by Chas Vrba
The New Adventures of Popeye by Sarah Rose Graber

2011
Easy Six by Scott OKen and Ernie Deak
Black and Blue by Anthony Tournis and Nick Digilio
The Gray Girl by Colin Milroy

2012
White Trash Wedding and a Funeral (20th Season Remount) by Mike Beyer and Bill Halve
Renfaire! A Fistful of Ducats! (20th Season Remount) by Matt Engle
Toast of the Town (20th Season Remount) by Scott OKen and Ernie Deak

2013
Incident on Run #1217 by Manny Tamayo: Winner, Joseph Jefferson Award, Best New Play (Non-Equity Wing)
Namosaur! by Scott OKen
Street Justice: Condition Red by Anthony Tournis and Colin Milroy

2014
Hey! Dancin'! Hey! Musical! by Kirk Pynchon and Mike Beyer, music & lyrics by Laura McKenzie
Take the Cake by Stacie Barra
Hotel Aphrodite by Angelina Martinez, story by Allison Cain

2015–16 season
The Last Big Mistake by Ernie Deak
Dating and Dragons by Mike Ooi

2016–17 season
Zombie Broads by Corrbette Pasko and Sara Sevigny
Born Ready by Stacie Barra
Fight City by Scott OKen

2017–18 season
Captain Steve's Caring Kingdom by Mike Ooi
The Next Big Thing by Carrie J. Sullivan
The Adventures of Spirit Force Five by Jill Oliver

2018–19 season
The Darkness After Dawn by Manny Tamayo
May the Road Rise Up by Shannon O'Neill
Prophet$ by Anthony Tournis

2019–20 season
Oh Sh#t! It's Haunted! by Scott OKen
Last Night in Karaoke Town by Mike Beyer and Kirk Pynchon
The HOA by Angelina Martinez

References

External links
Factory Theater's Official Website
Factory Theater's Myspace Page
Factory Theater's Official Facebook Page

1992 establishments in Illinois
Theatre companies in Chicago